This is a list of the National Register of Historic Places listings in Tama County, Iowa.

This is intended to be a complete list of the properties and districts on the National Register of Historic Places in Tama County, Iowa, United States.  Latitude and longitude coordinates are provided for many National Register properties and districts; these locations may be seen together in a map.

There are 13 properties listed on the National Register in the county.

Current listings

|}

Former listings

|}

See also

 List of National Historic Landmarks in Iowa
 National Register of Historic Places listings in Iowa
 Listings in neighboring counties: Benton, Black Hawk, Grundy, Iowa, Marshall, Poweshiek

References

 
Tama
Buildings and structures in Tama County, Iowa